The Jogye Order, officially the Jogye Order of Korean Buddhism (대한불교조계종, 大韓佛敎 曹溪宗), is the representative order of traditional Korean Buddhism with roots that date back 1200 years to the Later Silla National Master Doui, who brought Seon (known as Zen in the West) and the practice taught by the Sixth Patriarch, Huineng, from China around 820 CE. The name of the Order, Jogye, was adopted from the name of the village where Patriarch Huineng's home temple, Nanhua Temple, is located,.

The Jogye as a distinct school arose in the late 11th century when Jinul sought to combine the direct practices of Korean Seon with the theological underpinnings of sutra-based Buddhist schools as well as with Pure Land Buddhism.

In 1994, the Jogye order managed 1725 temples, 10,056 clerics and had 9,125,991 adherents.

The international Kwan Um School of Zen is a Jogye school founded by Seon Master Seungsahn, 78th Patriarch, who received Dharma transmission from Seon Master Gobong.

History

The original "Nine Schools" of Seon descended from Chan Buddhism were instrumental in the development of the nation during the Later Silla and thereafter. However, during Goryeo, the Cheontae under Uicheon rose to prominence and drew away many talented monks, forcing the Seon to innovate. In response to this, Jinul and Taego Bou led major Seon movements. Jinul in particular sought to develop an order that had the direct practices of Seon as its foundation but also gave importance to sutra study and reciting the name of Amitābha as found in the Pure Land teachings.  The basic precept Jinul advocated was "sudden enlightenment followed by gradual cultivation."

The Jogye was thus established as the representative Seon order until the persecution of the Joseon dynasty. Due to its inclusive nature, and emphasis on continual discipline, the Jogye gained considerable support from the military establishment, and developed across monasteries all over the Korean peninsula.

However, during the Joseon, Buddhism was repressed in favor of Neo-Confucianism. During the reign of Sejong (r. 1418-1450), two sects were formed, one of all the doctrinal schools and another of all the Seon schools. These were then temporarily disbanded under the reign of Yonsangun (r. 1494-1506), resulting in great confusion.

However, during the Japanese invasions of Korea (1592–1598), National Masters Seosan and Samyeong raised armies that protected the nation, which improved the situation of Buddhism for a time. However it was not until the political reforms of 1895 that monks were permitted in the cities again. Then in 1899, under the leadership of Seon Master Gyeongheo (1849-1912), monks petitioned from Haeinsa to reestablish the traditions and the philosophical basis for a reconstructed Buddhist order. Eventually, the Wonjong and Imjejong orders of the Linji school were founded, and attempts were made to revive the doctrinal schools and to reestablish activities in the cities, but these movements were soon suppressed during the Japanese occupation, which began in 1910.

Reaction to the occupation by Japan was mixed in the Jogye. While some collaborated with the authorities, monks such as Yongsong and Manhae led efforts to keep Korean Buddhist traditions alive. In 1921 the Sonhakwon Seon Meditation Center was established, and in 1929, a Monks’ Conference of Joseon was held. In 1937, a movement for the establishment of a Central Headquarters began, which was successful with the building of the Main Buddha Hall of Jogyesa in Seoul in 1938. Finally in 1941 the Joseon Buddhism Jogye Order which was distinctly Korean and free from Japanese influence, was established. This was the first legal Buddhist order in modern Korea and the precursor of today's Jogye Order.

Following liberation from Japan in 1945, Seon monks who had preserved and cherished Korean Buddhist traditions began a purification drive to re-establish the traditional celibate orders and take back the temples from married priests, a remnant of the Japanese Occupation. Finally, in 1955 the Jogye Order was established centered on celibate monks; however, as a result of mediation between the elder monks and the government, already-married priests were also included.

On April 11, 1962 Jogye Order of Korean Buddhism was officially established with three main goals: training and education; sutra translation into Korean from Hanja; and propagation. These goals continue to guide the Jogye Order today as well. It was in 1947-1949 that a group of monks at Bongamsa began a movement advocating "Living According to the Teachings of the Buddha" and this provided the opportunity for the establishment of fundamental principles and traditions as well as the accepted ceremonies of the order.

Internal Conflicts and Scandals
In the late 1990s, a struggle broke out between two factions of the Order for who would appoint the heads of major temples in Korea.  Although the court ruled in favor of the Purification and Reform Committee (PRC), the ruling was not sufficiently enforced, and fighting broke out between hundreds of monks using makeshift weaponry.

In more recent years, the Jogye Order has been beset with scandals involving gambling and sexual misconduct.

Conflicts with the Lee Myung-bak government
The Jogye Order faced conflict with the government led by former President Lee Myung-bak, a conservative Presbyterian Christian. The government is at odds with the Jogye Order by the decreasing of Temple Stay fundings, the lack of government recognition of the Lantern Festival, and omitted Buddhist temples, even famous ones, while marking the locations of even minor Christian churches in the new address system. After Lee's ascendence to the Presidency when the high proportion of Christians in relation to Buddhists in the public sector became known–particularly the president's cabinet, where there were 12 Christians to only one Buddhist. among other reported incidences.

In 2006, according to the Asia Times, "Lee also sent a video prayer message to a Christian rally held in the southern city of Busan in which the worship leader prayed feverishly: 'Lord, let the Buddhist temples in this country crumble down!'" Further, according to an article in Buddhist-Christian Studies: "Over the course of the last decade a fairly large number of Buddhist temples in South Korea have been destroyed or damaged by fire by misguided Protestant fundamentalists. More recently, Buddhist statues have been identified as idols, attacked and decapitated. Arrests are hard to effect, as the arsonists and vandals work by stealth of night."

Head temples

The numerous temples of the Jogye order are arranged under 24 "head temples."  The head temples each oversee a district (gyogu), containing a large number of subordinate temples.

1. Jogyesa:  Gyeonji Provinceng, Jongno District, central Seoul.
2. Yongjusa:  Taean-eup, Hwaseong, southern Gyeonggi Province.
3. Sinheungsa:  Seorak Provinceng, Sokcho, eastern Gangwon Province.
4. Woljeongsa:  Jinbu-myeon, Pyeongchang County, central Gangwon Province.
5. Beopjusa: Naesongni-myeon, Boeun County, North Chungcheong Province.
6. Magoksa	: Sagok-myeon, Gongju, South Chungcheong Province.
7. Sudeoksa:  Deoksan-myeon, Yesan County, South Chungcheong Province.
8. Jikjisa	: Daehang-myeon, Gimcheon, North Gyeongsang Province.
9. Donghwasa:  Dohak Provinceng, Dong District, Daegu.
10. Eunhaesa:  Cheongtong-myeon, Yeongcheon, North Gyeongsang Province.
11. Bulguksa:  Jinhyeon Provinceng, Gyeongju, North Gyeongsang Province
12. Haeinsa:  Gaya-myeon, Hapcheon County, South Gyeongsang Province.
13. Ssanggyesa:  Hwagae-myeon, Hadong County, South Gyeongsang Province.
14. Beomeosa:  Cheongnyong Provinceng, Geumjeong District, Busan.
15. Tongdosa:  Habuk-myeon, Yangsan, South Gyeongsang Province.
16. Gounsa	: Danchon-myeon, Uiseong County, North Gyeongsang Province.
17. Geumsansa: Geumsan-myeon, Gimje, North Jeolla Province.
18. Baegyangsa:  Bukha-myeon, Jangseong County, South Jeolla Province.
19. Hwaeomsa:  Masan-myeon, Gurye County, South Jeolla Province.
20. Songgwangsa:  Songgwang-myeon, Suncheon, South Jeolla Province.
21. Daeheungsa:  Samsan-myeon, Haenam County, South Jeolla Province.
22. Gwaneumsa: Jeju City, Jeju Province.
23. Seonunsa:  Asan-myeon, Gochang County, North Jeolla Province.
24. Bongseonsa:  Jinjeop-eup, Namyangju, Gyeonggi Province.

See also
Huineng, the Sixth Patriarch
Jinul, credited as the founder of Jogye Order
Taego Bou
Gyeongheo
Cheongnyeonsa
Mangong
Hanam Jungwon
Kobong
Hyobong Sunim
Seongcheol
Seungsahn
Pohwa
Samu (sunim)
Chan Buddhism
Five Houses of Chán
Caodong school
Linji school
Korean Seon
Nine mountain schools
Taego Order
Kwan Um School of Zen
Chogye International Zen Center
Korean Buddhism
Religion in Korea
Shingumdo— a sword school that emerged from the enlightenment of a Jogye Order monk

References

External links
Official site, in Korean
Official site, in English
Kwan Um School of Zen, in English

 
1354 establishments in Asia
 
14th-century establishments in Korea